Angul Thermal Power Station is a coal based thermal power project located at Derang village in Angul district in Indian state of Odisha. The power plant is one of the coal based power plants of  Jindal India Thermal Power Limited.

Coal for the power plant is sourced from  Mahanadi Coalfields Limited and water is sourced from Samal Barrage on Brahmani River which is 14 km away.

Bharat Heavy Electricals is the EPC contractor for this project.

Capacity
Its planned capacity is 1200 MW (2x600 MW). There is a plan to add third unit of 600 MW to this Angul-1 phase. Angul-2 phase having 2x660 MW units is yet to be approved by Government of India.

References

External links

 Angul power station at SourceWatch

Coal-fired power stations in Odisha
Angul district
2014 establishments in Odisha
Energy infrastructure completed in 2014